Darío Cajaravilla (born 14 March 1980) was an Argentine footballer who played as a centre back. He played for clubs including Colo-Colo and Aldosivi.

References
 

1980 births
Living people
Argentine footballers
Argentine expatriate footballers
Argentina international footballers
Aldosivi footballers
All Boys footballers
Colo-Colo footballers
CSyD Tristán Suárez footballers
Expatriate footballers in Chile
Association football central defenders
Sportspeople from Mar del Plata